The Bonallack Trophy is an amateur golf competition on the model of the Ryder Cup which opposes every two years a European team and a team representing Asia/Pacific. The venue alternates between courses in Europe and Asia/Pacific.

The first competition took place in 1998 in Perth, Australia. Since 2016 it has been held concurrently with the women's Patsy Hankins Trophy. Europe leads the series 7 wins to 3.

Format
The Bonallack Trophy involves various match play competitions between players selected from two teams of twelve representing Europe and Asia/Pacific. It takes place over three days, with a total of 32 matches being played, all matches being over 18 holes. The first two days comprise five foursomes matches and five four-ball matches. On the final day, there are 12 singles matches, when all twelve players compete.

The winner of each match scores a point for his team, with a half point each for any match that is tied after the 18 holes. The winning team is determined by cumulative total points. In the event of a tie (16 points each) the Bonallack Trophy is retained by the previous holder.

A foursomes match is a competition between two teams of two golfers. On a particular hole the golfers on the same team take alternate shots playing the same ball. One team member tees off on all the odd-numbered holes, and the other on all the even-numbered holes. Each hole is won by the team that completes the hole in the fewest shots. A fourball match is also a competition between two teams of two golfers, but all four golfers play their own ball throughout the round rather than alternating shots. The better score of the two golfers in a team determines the team's score on a particular hole; the score of the other member of the team is not counted. Each hole is won by the team whose individual golfer has the lowest score. A singles match is a standard match play competition between two golfers.

Team qualification and selection

European Team selection
The World Amateur Golf Rankings are used as the main reference for the selection process, in addition to a small number of players selected by the captain (known as "captain's picks"). According to the match conditions, no more than two players may be selected from the same country.

Results 

 The 2010 tournament was cancelled due to the Icelandic eruptions of Eyjafjallajökull volcano, which restricted air travel of the participants. Venue was to be Karnataka Golf Association, Bangalore, India, who subsequently held the tournament in 2014.
 The 2020 tournament was initially postponed due to the COVID-19 pandemic, and was rescheduled for 2021. In 2021 it was cancelled with the intention to play it in 2023.

Source:

Appearances
The following are those who have played in at least one of the matches.

Europe

  Antti Ahokas 2006
  Björn Åkesson 2008
  Christian Aronsen 1998
  David Boote 2016
  Wallace Booth 2008
  Edgar Catherine 2018
  Ashley Chesters 2014
  Luca Cianchetti 2016
  Todd Clements 2018
  Nicolas Colsaerts 2000
  Gary Cullen 2000
  Olivier David 1998
  Robin Dawson 2018
  Raphaël De Sousa 2002
  Thomas Detry 2012
  Tobias Dier 1998
  Jamie Donaldson 1998
  Alan Dunbar 2012
  Albert Eckhardt 2014
  Colin Edwards 2002
  Nigel Edwards 2002, 2004, 2006, 2008
  Sean Einhaus 2008
  Rhys Enoch 2012
  Ryan Evans 2014
  Gonzalo Fernández-Castaño 2004
  Oliver Fisher 2006
  Dominic Foos 2014
  Grant Forrest 2016
  Noel Fox 2004
  Mario Galiano Aguilar 2014, 2016
  Alfredo García-Heredia 2002
  Oliver Gillberg 2018
  Zac Gould 2006
  Julien Guerrier 2006
  Ivan Cantero Gutierrez 2016
  Marc Hammer 2018
  Anders Schmidt Hansen 2002
  Peter Hanson 1998
  James Heath 2004
  Benjamin Hébert 2008
  Ángel Hidalgo 2018
  Jack Hiluta 2012
  Rasmus Højgaard 2018
  Matias Honkala 2018
  Daan Huizing 2012
  Jack Hume 2016
  Mikko Ilonen 2000
  Peter Jespersen 2000
  Matthew Jordan 2018
  Alexandre Kaleka 2008
  Robert S. Karlsson 2012
  Ken Kearney 1998
  Robin Kind 2012
  Jeroen Krietemeijer 2016
  Frédéric Lacroix 2018
  Moritz Lampert 2012
  Shane Lowry 2008
  Joost Luiten 2006
  Callum Macaulay 2008
  Pablo Martín 2004
  Stefano Mazzoli 2016
  Jack McDonald 2016
  Brian McElhinney 2004
  Dermot McElroy 2014
  Rory McIlroy 2006
  Edoardo Molinari 2002, 2004
  Francesco Molinari 2004
  Bradley Moore 2016
  Gavin Moynihan 2014
  Pedro Oriol 2006, 2008
  Roberto Paolillo 1998
  Renato Paratore 2014
  David Patrick 2000
  Robin Petersson 2016
  Mats Pilo 2002
  Antonio Pons 1998
  Jon Rahm 2012
  Richie Ramsay 2006
  Graham Rankin 1998
  Stefano Reale 2000
  Christian Reimbold 2002
  Kristoffer Reitan 2018
  Max Roehrig 2014
  Justin Rose 1998
  James Ross 2014
  Phil Rowe 2000
  Oscar Sanchez 2000
  Hugo Santos 2004
  Marcel Schneider 2012
  Tino Schuster 2000
  Joel Sjöholm 2008
  Mads Søgaard 2014
  Matt Stanford 2002
  Ben Taylor 2012
  Marius Thorp 2006
  Manuel Trappel 2012
  Ashton Turner 2016
  Damian Ulrich 2006
  Sami Välimäki 2018
  Jan-Willem van Hoof 2004
  Robbie van West 2014
  Didier de Vooght 1998
  Jonas Waahlstedt 2000
  Marc Warren 2002
  Martin Wiegele 2002
  Danny Willett 2008
  Craig Williams 2000
  Stuart Wilson 2002, 2004
  Gary Wolstenholme 1998, 2000, 2004, 2006
  Chris Wood 2008

Asia/Pacific

  Richard Best 1998
  Rohan Blizard 2008
  Carl Brooking 2000
  Benjamin Campbell 2012
  Chan Shih-chang 2008
  Chan Yih-shin 2000
  Chang Hong-wei 2002
  Chen Ming-chuan 2008
  S. Chikkarangappa 2012
  Chiu Han-ting 2016
  Varut Chomchalam 2008
  Brett Coletta 2016
  Andrew Dodt 2006
  Dou Zecheng 2014
  Geoff Drakeford 2014
  Samarth Dwivedi 2016
  Anthony Fernando 2008
  Nick Flanagan 2004
  Gregory Foo 2016, 2018
  Marcus Fraser 2002
  Haruo Fujishima 2002, 2004
  Scott Gardiner 2000
  Josh Geary 2006
  James Gill 2008
  Lloyd Jefferson Go 2018
  Han Jae-min 2018
  Luke Hickmott 2002
  Jake Higginbottom 2012
  Daniel Hillier 2018
  Anujit Hirunratanakorn 2006
  Mathew Holten 2004
  Hidemasa Hoshino 1998
  Mu Hu 2006
  Hung Chien-yao 2012
  Yuta Ikeda 2004, 2006
  Bradley Iles 2004
  Toshiki Ishitoku 2016
  Yuki Ito 2006, 2008
  Jeong Ji-ho 2002
  Jin Cheng 2014
  Khalin Joshi 2012
  Jung Sung-han 2000
  Harmeet Kahlon 1998
  Takumi Kanaya 2016, 2018
  Kang Sung-hoon 2006
  Shiv Kapur 2002, 2004
  Sadom Kaewkanjana 2018
  Shahid Javed Khan 2000, 2004
  Kim Bi-o 2008
  Kim Dong-min 2018
  Kim Kyung-tae 2004, 2006
  Kim Nam-hun 2014
  Kim Yeong-su 2008
  Kenta Konishi 
  Ashok Kumar 2000
  Kwon Ki-taek 2002
  Brad Lamb 2000
  Rogelio La'o III 1998
  Won Joon Lee 2006
  Lee Chang-woo 2012
  Lee Chieh-po 2014
  Danny Lee 2008
  Lee Dong-hwan 2004
  Eddie Lee
  Lee Jae-kyeoung 2016
  Min Woo Lee 2018
  Lee Soo-min 2012, 2014 
  Ben Leong 2004, 2006
  Lin Wen-ko 1998
  Taylor Macdonald 2014
  Joshua Mann 2014
  Hideki Matsuyama 2012
  Prom Meesawat 2002
  Keshav Misra 2002
  Yūsaku Miyazato 2000, 2002
  Shinichi Mizuno 2014
  Zach Murray 2016
  Kim Jong Myung 1998
  Ramasamy Nachimuthu 1998
  Kammalas Namuangruk 2018
  James Nitties 2004
  Geoff Ogilvy 1998
  Kazuya Osawa 2018
  Juvic Pagunsan 2004
  Mathew Perry 2012
  Mark Purser 2006
  Angelo Que 2000
  Aman Raj 2016
  Rahizam Ramli 2000
  Airil Rizman 2000
  Gerald Rosales 1998
  Brett Rumford 1998
  Ajeetesh Sandhu 2006
  Daichi Sato 2014
  Taihei Sato 2012
  Reon Sayer 1998
  Cameron Smith 2012
  Natipong Srithong 2012
  Tim Stewart 2008
  Su Chin-jung 1998
  Naoyuki Tamura 2008
  Hideto Tanihara 2000
  Karan Taunk 2014
  Rayhan Thomas 2018
  Luke Toomey 2016
  Tim Wilkinson 2002
  Shae Wools-Cobb 2018
  Yu Chun-an 2016
  Yun Sung-ho 2016

References

External links
"England pair selected for Bonallack Trophy". England Golf. 19 February 2010.

Team golf tournaments
Recurring sporting events established in 1998